Sazak is a surname of Turkish origin. It refers to wind in the Turkish dialects spoken in Anatolia. Notable people with the surname include:

 Derya Sazak (born 1956), Turkish journalist
 Gün Sazak (1932–1980), assassinated Turkish politician
 Güven Sazak (1935–2011), former president of Fenerbahçe SK

References

Surnames of Turkish origin